Swerting (Proto-Norse *Swartingaz ) is briefly mentioned in Beowulf, where he had a son or son-in-law, Hrethel, who was the maternal grandfather of the hero Beowulf.

The Heaðobard tradition
A Swerting of the same timeframe also appears in Scandinavian traditions as the killer of a Danish king named Fróði/Frotho, who corresponds to Froda, the Heaðobard, in Beowulf. In the Scandinavian traditions, Froda's son Ingeld also appears with the name forms Ingjald or Ingellus.

Skjöldunga saga and Bjarkarímur
The Skjöldunga saga and the Bjarkarímur tell that the king of Sweden, Jorund, was defeated by the Danish king Fróði, who made him a tributary and took his daughter. The daughter gave birth to Halfdan, but another woman became Fróði's legitimate wife and gave him an heir named Ingjaldr. Together with one of his earls, Swerting, Jorund conspired against Fróði and killed him during the blót.

Gesta Danorum

There is also a second version in Gesta Danorum, concerning the adventures of Starkad, and which is based on the old warrior who restarted the conflict between the Heaðobards and the Danes. The Danish king Frotho (Froda) was killed through treachery by a Saxon named Swerting (Swertingus) (cf. the Swedish earl, above). Frotho's son Ingellus (Ingeld) lived a wanton life and married one of Swerting's daughters. This angered Starkad so much that he enlisted at the Swedish king Halfdan's (Haldanus) court instead. As Ingellus continued his sinful life and did not do his duty to avenge his father, Starkad appeared during a banquet that Ingellus had with the sons of Swerting, his father's slayer. Starkad strongly admonished Ingellus and humiliated his queen who tried to calm Starkad with kindness and her costly ribbon. Starkad succeeded in exciting Ingellus to kill Swerting's sons and to divorce his Saxon bride.

Historia Brittonum 

The pedigree of king Aella of Deira given in Historia Brittonum includes the name "Sguerthing" as great-grandfather of the king, and this has been interpreted as a reference to the Swerting of Beowulf.  The name does not appear in other versions of the royal pedigree and may represent an attempt by the author of Historia Brittonum to interpose this heroic character into the royal pedigree.

Notes and references

English heroic legends
Kings of the Geats
Characters in Beowulf